"Upside Down" is a song written, co-produced, and performed by Jack Johnson for the 2006 animated film Curious George. It is the first track and first single from the soundtrack album Sing-A-Longs and Lullabies for the Film Curious George, which was released in February 2006 (same month as theaters).

Commercial performance
It peaked at #38 on the Billboard Hot 100 and was Johnson's only US Top 40 hit until "You and Your Heart" in 2010. Released as a single in the UK on May 22, 2006, it debuted at #45 in the UK Singles Chart the day before its physical release via download sales alone. The following week, it became Jack Johnson's second UK Top 40 entry, peaking at #30. It has been certified Platinum by the RIAA for sales of over 1,000,000 in the United States alone.

Music video
The music video begins with Johnson walking along a pier carrying a guitar as Curious George watches from a tree. Johnson then slips on a banana peel and falls into the ocean. He is then shown in place of The Man With The Yellow Hat in several scenes from the film. The video was directed by prolific music video directors The Malloys.

Track listing

CD single
 "Upside Down"
 "Breakdown"

Charts and certifications

Weekly charts

Year-end charts

Certifications

References

External links
 Upside Down lyrics
 Video on YouTube

2006 singles
Animated music videos
Jack Johnson (musician) songs
Songs written by Jack Johnson (musician)
Songs written for animated films
Music videos directed by The Malloys
2005 songs